This is a list of LGBT characters in radio and podcast programs. Podcasts are similar to radio programs in form, but they exist as audio files that can be played at a listener's convenience, anytime or anywhere.

The orientation can be described in the dialogue or otherwise mentioned. Roles include lead, main, recurring, supporting, and guest.

The names are organized alphabetically by surname (i.e. last name), or by single name if the character does not have a surname.

List

See also

 List of lesbian characters in television
 List of gay characters in television
 List of bisexual characters in television
 List of transgender characters in television
 List of comedy television series with LGBT characters
 List of dramatic television series with LGBT characters: 1970s–2000s
 List of dramatic television series with LGBT characters: 2010s
 List of dramatic television series with LGBT characters: 2020s
 List of made-for-television films with LGBT characters
 List of soap operas with LGBT characters
 List of reality television programs with LGBT cast members

References

Further reading
 
 
 
 
 
 
 
 
 
 
 
 
 
 
 
 

Radio and podcasts
LGBT
Podcasting lists